Ibi is a town located in the comarca of Alcoià, in the province of Alicante, Spain. As of 2009, Ibi has a total population of c. 24,000 inhabitants. The town, which is located 37 km from the city of Alicante, is surrounded by mountains and gorges.

The economy of Ibi is chiefly based on the toy industry, the most important of this kind in Spain. As a result, many other related industries have also emerged in the last years: plastic, metal, machinery and others. There are some factories making construction materials, ice creams and tiger nut milk, also. Some of the most important monuments in Ibi are the Catholic Church of the Transfiguration and the monument to the Three Wise Men, possibly the only one in the world.

Ibi was also the location for the issue of both the 25 céntimos and 1 peseta by the Republicans during 1937. Worldwide, it is famous for the centuries of annual festival of Els Enfarinats; in particular, the fight with flour and eggs.

Twin towns
 Tomelloso, Spain

See also 
 Font Roja Natural Park

References

External links
Official site 

Municipalities in the Province of Alicante